A silence procedure or tacit consent or tacit acceptance procedure (French: procédure d'approbation tacite; Latin: qui tacet consentire videtur, "he who is silent is taken to agree", "silence implies/means consent") is a way of formally adopting texts, often, but not exclusively in international political context. 

A textbook on diplomacy describes the silence procedure thus:

In the context of international organisations, the subject of the procedure is often a joint statement or a procedural document, a formal vote on which with the members meeting in person is deemed unnecessary. Indeed, it is often impractical to try to stage a meeting between representatives of all member states either due to the limited importance of the text to be agreed upon or due to time constraints in the case of a joint declaration prompted by recent events. Organisations making extensive use of the procedure are, among others, the European Union, NATO and the Organization for Security and Co-operation in Europe (OSCE).

A draft version of the text is circulated among participants who have a last opportunity to propose changes or amendments to the text. If no amendments are proposed  (if no one 'breaks the silence') before the deadline of the procedure, the text is considered adopted by all participants. Often this procedure is the last step in adopting the text, after the basic premises of the text have been agreed upon in previous negotiations. 'Breaking the silence' is only a last resort in case a participant still has fundamental problems with parts of the text and is therefore the exception rather than the rule.

Council of the European Union
Article 12(2) of the Rules of Procedure of the Council of the European Union states:

Organization for Security and Co-operation in Europe
An expression of the silence procedure is contained in Annex 1(A) "Application of a silence procedure in the Permanent Council and the Forum for Security Co-operation" of the Rules of Procedure of the OSCE (2006):

See also
 Unanimous consent

References

Diplomacy
Procedure
Consent